Herbert Raymond "Hub" McQuillan (October 25, 1891 – November 25, 1972) was an American football and basketball coach and college athletics administrator. He served as the head football coach at Stetson University from 1924 to 1934 and again from 1955 to 1956, compiling a record of 50–42–8. McQuillan was also the head basketball coach at Stetson from 1924 to 1935, at Texas A&M University from 1935 to 1941, and at Texas Christian University from 1941 to 1948, amassing a career college basketball record of 220–224.

McQuillan was a native of Rochester, Minnesota. He died on November 25, 1972, at Tallahassee Memorial Hospital in Tallahassee, Florida.

Head coaching record

College football

References

1891 births
1972 deaths
Stetson Hatters athletic directors
Stetson Hatters football coaches
Stetson Hatters men's basketball coaches
TCU Horned Frogs men's basketball coaches
Texas A&M Aggies football coaches
Texas A&M Aggies men's basketball coaches
High school football coaches in Florida
Sportspeople from Rochester, Minnesota